8 Cygni is a single star in the northern constellation of Cygnus. Based upon its parallax of 3.79 mas, it is approximately 860 light-years (260 parsecs) away from Earth. It is visible to the naked eye as a faint, bluish-white hued star with an apparent visual magnitude of about 4.7. The star is moving closer to the Earth with a heliocentric radial velocity of −21 km/s.

This is an aging subgiant star, as indicated by its spectral type of B3IV. Its effective temperature of 16,100 K fits into the normal range of B-type stars: 11,000 to 25,000 K. 8 Cygni is about twice as hot as the Sun, and it is six times larger and many times brighter in comparison. The elemental abundances are near solar.

References

B-type subgiants
Cygnus (constellation)
Durchmusterung objects
Cygni, 08
184171
096052
7426